Jamal Abdi Dirieh is a Djiboutian long-distance runner. He represented his country in the 5000 metres at the 2017 World Championships narrowly missing the final. In addition, he won a silver medal at the 2016 World U20 Championships.

International competitions

Personal bests

Outdoor
5000 metres – 13:13.45 (Heusden-Zolder 2017)
10,000 metres – 30:07.47 (Tlemcen 2016)

References

1997 births
Living people
Djiboutian male long-distance runners
World Athletics Championships athletes for Djibouti